Malcolm H. Mabry Jr. (June 28, 1933 – June 12, 2020) was an American politician from the state of Mississippi. He served in the Mississippi House of Representatives from 1964 to 1980, representing Coahoma County, and in the Mississippi State Senate from 1980 to 1988, representing the 11th (Coahoma and Tunica Counties) district. He was also a teacher and farmer.

References

1933 births
2020 deaths
People from Dublin, Mississippi
Democratic Party members of the Mississippi House of Representatives
Democratic Party Mississippi state senators
Farmers from Mississippi